Adrienne La Russa is an American actress known for her role as Brooke Hamilton on Days of Our Lives, which she played from 1975 to 1977. Her film career included roles in The Black Sheep (1968), Beatrice Cenci (1969), Keep It in the Family (1973), The Man Who Fell to Earth (1976) and Uncle Joe Shannon (1978).

She also made a few guest appearances on television in the late 1970s and early 1980s and she had a supporting role in the 1978 miniseries Centennial. La Russa played Clemma Zendt, the tempestuous daughter of series protagonists Levi and Lucinda Zendt.

La Russa was born in the borough of Brooklyn, New York City, New York, where a childhood friend was fellow future actor Henry Winkler. She graduated from Cold Spring Harbor High School in Cold Spring Harbor, New York, on Long Island.

Her 1984 marriage to actor and martial artist Steven Seagal was annulled that same year. She married Robert French on December 31, 1987.

Filmography

Film

Television

References

External links
 

Adrienne La Russa Credits at TV Guide
 
 

American soap opera actresses
American film actresses
American television actresses
American people of Italian descent
Living people
Cold Spring Harbor Jr./Sr. High School alumni
Steven Seagal
Year of birth missing (living people)